The 1957–58 National Hurling League was the 27th season of the National Hurling League.

Division 1

Tipperary came into the season as defending champions of the 1956-57 season. Kerry and Limerick entered Division 1 as the promoted team from the previous season.

On 11 May 1958, Wexford won the title following a 5-7 to 4-8 victory over Limerick in the final. It was their second league title overall and their first since 1955-56.

Group 1A table

Group 1B table

Knock-out stage

Final

Division 2

Group 2A table

Group 2B table

Knock-out stage

Final

References

National Hurling League seasons
Lea
Lea